Cerautola is a genus of butterflies in the family Lycaenidae, endemic to the Afrotropical realm.

Species
Subgenus Cerautola
Cerautola adolphifrederici (Schultze, 1911)
Cerautola ceraunia (Hewitson, 1873)
Cerautola crippsi (Stoneham, 1934)
Cerautola crowleyi (Sharpe, 1890)
Cerautola cuypersi Libert & Collins, 2015
Cerautola delassisei Bouyer, 2013
Cerautola fisheri Libert & Collins, 1999
Cerautola legeri Libert, 1999
Cerautola miranda (Staudinger, 1889)
Cerautola mittoni (Jackson, 1964)
Cerautola richardsoni Libert & Collins, 2015
Cerautola semibrunnea (Bethune-Baker, 1916)
Subgenus Hewitola Libert, 1999
Cerautola decellei (Stempffer, 1956)
Cerautola hewitsoni (Mabille, 1877)
Cerautola hewitsonioides (Hawker-Smith, 1933)
Cerautola stempfferi (Jackson, 1962)

References

Seitz, A. Die Gross-Schmetterlinge der Erde 13: Die Afrikanischen Tagfalter. Plate XIII 64 e

Poritiinae
Butterfly genera